

The Alcantarilla Dam is a ruined Roman gravity dam in Mazarambroz, Toledo province, Castilla-La Mancha, Spain, dating to the 2nd century BC. The toponym "Alcantarilla" means conduit and is of Arabic origin: the Latin name is unknown.

The dam is believed to be the oldest dam in Spain, and is possibly the oldest known Roman dam. The dam and reservoir were part of the water supply system of the city of Toletum (Toledo). They were constructed on a tributary of the River Tagus. The water was conveyed to the city by an aqueduct which passed through Layos.

Structure
The structure appears to have been similar to the surviving Proserpina Dam near Merida, an earth dam with a stone retaining wall. The upstream side of the wall was faced with cut stone blocks.

Conservation
The structure has been in ruins for a long time. There has been speculation that it was not strong enough to cope with a large volume of water. It was possibly breached in the Roman era. Another possibility is that the masonry collapsed upstream, perhaps by the pressure of the earth fill when the water was low, since, unlike later dams, it was not buttressed on the upstream side.

The remains of Toledo's Roman water supply system are partly protected by a heritage designation (Bien de Interés Cultural).

See also 
 List of Roman dams and reservoirs
 Roman architecture
 Roman engineering

Notes

References

Further reading 
 
 
 

Roman dams in Spain
Gravity dams
Ancient Roman buildings and structures in the province of Toledo
Water supply of Toledo, Spain